The women's football tournament of the 2016 South Asian Games is the second edition of the tournament. It was played at Jawaharlal Nehru Stadium in Shillong, India, from 5 February to 15 February 2016.

India defended their title with a 4–0 win over Nepal.

Squads

Format
It is being played on round-robin format. The top two teams will be play in the final. The team finishing third in the Group Stage will be awarded with Bronze Medal.

Group stage

Gold medal match

Winner

Goalscorers
5 Goals
 Yumnam Kamala Devi
3 Goals
 Ngangom Bala Devi
2 Goals

 Anu Lama
 Dangmei Grace
 Fadhuwa Zahir
 Niru Thapa
 Sabina Khatun
 Sabitra Bhandari
 Srimoti Krishnarani Sarkar

1 Goal

 Loitongbam Ashalata Devi
 Dipa Adhikari
 Hasara Dilrangi
 Marzia
 R Ekanayake
 Sanju Yadav
 Sapana Lama
 Sasmita Malik

Own Goal

 A.S. Perera (playing against )
 Hasara Dilrangi (playing against )

See also
 Football at the 2016 South Asian Games – Men's tournament

References

External links
 Futbol24 - AFC - Women South Asian Games - Results, fixtures, tables, statistics

2016 South Asian Games
2016 South Asian Games
2016 in women's association football